Ernesto "Estong" Ballesteros (born January 28, 1973 in Manila, Philippines) is a Filipino former professional basketball player in the Philippine Basketball Association. He was drafted fourth overall by Shell in 1997.

Player profile
Ballesteros played for several teams during his earlier career. He played for Shell, Coca-Cola, and for the Barangay Ginebra Kings. He also played in the defunct MBA for the Pangasinan Presidents and Pamapanga Dragons. He was a free agent in the 2005–06 and 2006–07 seasons, but he was signed by Welcoat in the 2007–08 PBA Philippine Cup in a two-year contract.

References

External links
PBA league profile

1973 births
Filipino men's basketball players
Living people
Basketball players from Manila
Barangay Ginebra San Miguel players
Rain or Shine Elasto Painters players
UST Growling Tigers basketball players
Small forwards
Power forwards (basketball)
Shell Turbo Chargers players
Pop Cola Panthers players
Powerade Tigers players
Tagalog people
Shell Turbo Chargers draft picks